The Purépecha religion is the religion of the Purépecha people.

See also
 Purépecha deities

Purépecha
Pre-Columbian mythology and religion